The European Trotting Derby, also called UET Grand Prix and Grand Prix de l'UET, is an annual Group One harness event that is arranged by the European Trotting Union, UET. The final takes place on a racetrack in one of the member countries of UET. The event is open for 4-year-old European-born trotters and was first raced in 1985. The 2009 final will be hosted by Tampere Racetrack, Finland, and has a purse of approximately US$607,000, or €460,000.

Racing conditions

The races
To qualify for the European Trotting Derby final, horses must progress from the qualifying races. These races takes place on two racetracks in two countries every year, in 2009 at Vincennes, France and Tampere, Finland.

Distance and starting method
The distance has most years been 2,100 meters. Some years, a slight variation has been made, but the distance has always been in the interval 2,000-2,140 meters. The race has always been started by the use of auto start.

Past winners

Drivers with most wins
 4 - Stig H. Johansson (1985, 1986, 1988, 2001) 
 2 - Dominique Locqueneux

Trainers with most wins
 4 - Stig H. Johansson (1985, 1986, 1988, 2001)
 2 - Jean-Pierre Dubois (1987, 2004)

Sires with at least two winning offsprings
 2 - Pershing (Mack the Knife, Atas Rocket)

Countries, number of wins
 10 - 
 9 - 
 2 - 
 1 - 
 1 - 
 1 -

Winner with lowest odds 
 Winning odds: 1.20 - Ina Scot (1993)

Winner with highest odds 
 Winning odds: 22.00 - Progress Value (1994)

Fastest winner
 1:11.7 (km rate) - Kiss Melody (2002)

All winners of the European Trotting Derby

References

Harness racing in Europe